Ophisurus is a genus of eels in the snake eel family Ophichthidae. It currently contains the following species:

 Ophisurus macrorhynchos Bleeker, 1853
 Ophisurus serpens (Linnaeus, 1758) (Serpent eel)

References

 

Ophichthidae
Ray-finned fish genera